The magic cross is a combination of piercings, consisting of both an ampallang and an apadravya. These two piercings together form a cross through the glans of the human penis. Although each piercing is usually done during separate sessions, some people have had them both done in the same sitting.

External links 
 "Magic cross" at the BME Encyclopedia

Penis piercings